Mikhail Ilyukhin (born November 21, 1966) is a retired Russian mixed martial artist and professional wrestler who competed in the light heavyweight division.  He competed in both Fighting Network Rings, and Pride Fighting Championships, and was a prominent member of Russia Top Team, where he trained with the likes of Volk Han, Fedor Emelianenko, and Sergei Kharitonov. At Pride 26, Ilyukhin lost by stoppage to Quinton Jackson. He won his last fight at K-1 – Hero's Lithuania against Jordanas Poskaitis on November 26, 2005. It appears that following the demise of the Russia Top Team Ilyukhin has retired.

Career

IAFC & RINGS
After a successful career in sambo, Ilyukhin debuted in the professional wrestling promotion Rings in 1994, submitting Mitsuya Nagai in his first match. He would become a part of the Rings Russia team, along with Volk Han, Andrei Kopylov and Nikolai Zouev. One year later, he had his first contact in MMA represented Rings Russia in the International Absolute Fighting Council (IAFC)'s Absolute Fighting Eurasian Championship. He won the event tournament by submitting six opponents on a row, five of them by Achilles hold and in roughly one minute each.

Only three months after, he returned to IAFC for a similar format, and his performance seemed to follow close. He made short work of his first two opponents with an armbar and a guillotine choke, submitted kickboxer Igor Vovchanchyn by digging his chin into Igor's eye from dominant position, and skipped a match when teammate Achmed Sagidgusenov threw the fight for him. However, at the finals Ilyukhin would meet Brazilian jiu-jitsu exponent Ricardo Morais, an apprentice of Carlson Gracie who outweighed Mikhail by almost 70 Ib. The Russian unexpectedly dominated the first segments of the match, hitting repeated headbutts and punches through Morais's guard until swelling shut one of his eyes, but he made the mistake of standing up, and it allowed the Brazilian to sweep him and take his back. After a long series of elbow strikes to Ilyukhin's spine, Morais locked a rear naked choke and got the win.

Despite the loss, the bout against Morais gained him fame in the Brazilian vale tudo scene, and he got a spot in the first event of Universal Vale Tudo Fighting, which was coincidentally hosted in Japan. He faced another against another Carlson Gracie trainee, the debutant Carlos Barreto, still heavier yet more similar to him in weight. The bout ended in the second round with Ilyukhin submitted again by rear naked choke. Months after, Ilyukhin participated in Shoot Boxing's MMA S-Cup event and was pitted against capoeira fighter Mestre Hulk, who was known for his tournament victory against Brazilian jiu-jitsu world champion Amaury Bitetti. The Russian won the match using the already known chin submission.

Back in Rings, Ilyukhin had a vale tudo rules match in 1996 against Adilson Lima, a Carlos Gracie, Jr. trainee who had been famously defeated twice by Vovchanchyn in the first IAFC tournament. The match started slow, with Lima taking down Illukhin and mounting him, but the Russian escaped thanks to a failed rear naked choke attempt. Illyukhin gained a yellow card by illegally grabbing the ropes in order not to be taken down again, yet he managed to take down the Brazilian himself and almost finished him with an ankle hold before the end of the time. The match was declared a draw, but Lima and his cornermen Renzo Gracie protested the result and demanded another round, which Rings chairman Akira Maeda and referee Yuji Shimada eventually had to concede. The fight was restarted for a heated contest, as Lima attacked Illyukhin at the handshake and grabbed the ropes himself while Mikhail threw an illegal headbutt, and it featured yet another controversial moment when Shimada stopped the match to a submission win for Lima before Illyukhin surrendered.

Mikhail returned to MMA format in 1999 facing Ultimate Fighting Championship Heavyweight Champion Randy Couture. The American, as a decorated wrestler, managed to stop Ilyukhin's insistent takedowns and push him against the ring ropes, almost making him fall through them at one point. After brawling on the clinch for most of the match, Illyukhin secured an arm with his back against the turnbuckle and dropped for a Kimura lock, but the referee intervened to reposition them on the center of the ring. In the process, the Russian visibly advanced the hold, and once restarted the fight, he completed it and Couture was forced to tap out. The win was immediately contested by Couture, but nothing come out of the complain. 

In 1999, Ilyukhin was selected to compete in Rings' first MMA tournament, King of Kings 1999. He defeated his two first opponents, Tito Ortiz's teammate Justin McCully and HOOKnSHOOT tournament winner Brad Kohler, and then faced luta livre fighter Renato Sobral at the block's finals. The bout saw Sobral earning a yellow card for intentionally throwing Mikhail over the top rope, as well as the Russian attempting takedowns and boxing in order to try to hold his own. After the judges ruled a draw, an overtime was called; Mikhail performed a standing Kimura lock entry, but Sobral skillfully reversed it to an armbar and got the win. Ilyukhin also took part in the next edition of the tournament in 2000, facing Tsuyoshi Kohsaka in the first round. Although the bout looked to be back and forth, Kohsaka landed a striking combination in the second round which knocked Mikhail out, eliminating him from the event.

Pride
Ilyukhin took part in a special match against Quinton Jackson in Pride Fighting Championships in 2003. He was heavily challenged for the bout, finding himself outweighed by an excess of 60 lb and being also 12 years older than Jackson, but he chose to fight nonetheless. Initially, the Russian was successful in bringing Jackson to the ground and threatening him with submissions, including a Kimura that almost succeeded, but his opponent powered out and started scoring strikes. Ilyukhin was knocked down and gained a yellow card for crawling under the ropes, and received further hits in his next attempt to go to the ground. Ultimately, after avoiding a triangle choke by the Russian, Jackson gained side control and threw knees to the head and liver, making Ilyukhin tap out.

Championships and accomplishments
Fighting Network Rings
1997 Rings Mega Battle Tournament Runner up
2001 Rings Openweight Championship Tournament semifinalist
International Absolute Fighting Council
IAFC Absolute Fighting Eurasian Championship Tournament Winner
IAFC Absolute Fighting Championship Tournament Runner Up

Mixed martial arts record

|-
| Win
| align=center| 30-12-1
| Jordanas Poskaitis
| Submission (half boston crab)
| Hero's Lithuania 2005
| 
| align=center| N/A
| 
| Vilnius, Lithuania
| 
|-
| Win
| align=center| 29-12-1
| Petrov Kolev
| Submission (heel hook)
| Rings Russia: CIS vs. The World
| 
| align=center| 1
| 
| Lithuania
| 
|-
| Loss
| align=center| 28-12-1
| Quinton Jackson
| Submission (knee to the body)
| Pride 26
| 
| align=center| 1
| align=center| 6:26
| Yokohama, Japan
| 
|-
| Win
| align=center| 28-11-1
| Katsuhisa Fujii
| Submission (guillotine choke)
| PC: Premium Challenge
| 
| align=center| 1
| align=center| 5:45
| Tokyo, Japan
| 
|-
| Draw
| align=center| 27-11-1
| Hiromitsu Kanehara
| Draw
| Rings: World Title Series Grand Final
| 
| align=center| 3
| align=center| 5:00
| Yokohama, Japan
| 
|-
| Loss
| align=center| 27-11
| Bobby Hoffman
| TKO (corner stoppage)
| Rings: 10th Anniversary
| 
| align=center| 2
| align=center| 5:00
| Tokyo, Japan
| 
|-
| Win
| align=center| 27-10
| Borislav Jeliazkov
| Submission (armbar)
| Rings Lithuania: Bushido Rings 2
| 
| align=center| 2
| align=center| 2:06
| Yokohama, Japan
| 
|-
| Win
| align=center| 26-10
| Kestutis Smirnovas
| Submission (achilles lock)
| Rings Lithuania: Bushido Rings 2
| 
| align=center| 1
| 
| Lithuania
| 
|-
| Win
| align=center| 25-10
| Martin Lazarev
| Decision (4-0 points)
| Rings Russia: Russia vs. Bulgaria
| 
| align=center| 1
| align=center| 10:00
| Ekaterinburg, Russia
| 
|-
| Loss
| align=center| 24-10
| Tsuyoshi Kohsaka
| KO (punches)
| Rings: King of Kings 2000 Block B
| 
| align=center| 2
| align=center| 1:53
| Osaka, Japan
| 
|-
| Win
| align=center| 24-9
| Valerijus Golubovskis
| Submission (armbar)
| Rings Lithuania: Bushido Rings 1
| 
| align=center| N/A
| 
| Lithuania
| 
|-
| Win
| align=center| 23-9
| Bakouri Gogitidze
| Submission (Achilles lock)
| Rings: Russia vs. Georgia
| 
| align=center| 1
| align=center| 7:25
| Russia
| 
|-
| Win
| align=center| 22-9
| Emil Kristev
| Submission (Achilles Lock)
| Rings Russia: Russia vs. Bulgaria
| 
| align=center| 1
| align=center| 0:00
| Tula, Russia
| 
|-
| Win
| align=center| 21-9
| Lee Hasdell
| Decision
| Rings Russia: Russia vs. The World
| 
| align=center| 3
| align=center| 5:00
| Ekaterinburg, Russia
| 
|-
| Loss
| align=center| 20-9
| Renato Sobral
| Submission (armbar)
| Rings: King of Kings 1999 Final
| 
| align=center| 3
| align=center| 0:40
| Tokyo, Japan
| 
|-
| Win
| align=center| 20-8
| Brad Kohler
| Submission (armbar)
| Rings: King of Kings 1999 Block A
| 
| align=center| 1
| align=center| 2:16
| Tokyo, Japan
| 
|-
| Win
| align=center| 19-8
| Justin McCully
| Technical Submission (achilles lock)
| Rings: King of Kings 1999 Block A
| 
| align=center| 1
| align=center| 4:48
| Tokyo, Japan
| 
|-
| Loss
| align=center| 18-8
| Bakouri Gogitidze
| Submission (rear-naked choke)
| Rings: Rings Georgia
| 
| align=center| 1
| align=center| 5:07
| Georgia, United States
| 
|-
| Win
| align=center| 18-7
| Joop Kasteel
| Submission (achilles lock)
| Rings: Rise 3rd
| 
| align=center| 1
| align=center| 9:40
| Japan
| 
|-
| Win
| align=center| 17-7
| Randy Couture
| Submission (kimura)
| Rings: Rise 1st
| 
| align=center| 1
| align=center| 7:43
| Tokyo, Japan
| 
|-
| Win
| align=center| 16-7
| Masayuki Naruse
| Submission
| Rings: Third Fighting Integration
| 
| align=center| 1
| align=center| 13:52
| Tokyo, Japan
| 
|-
| Loss
| align=center| 15-7
| Kiyoshi Tamura
| Submission 
| Rings: Battle Dimensions Tournament 1997 Final
| 
| align=center| 1
| align=center| 18:12
| Tokyo, Japan
| 
|-
| Win
| align=center| 15-6
| Volk Han
| Submission 
| Rings: World Mega Battle Tournament 1997: Semi-Finals
| 
| align=center| 1
| align=center| 9:36
| Fukuoka, Japan
| 
|-
| Win
| align=center| 14-6
| Tsuyoshi Kohsaka
| Submission
| Rings: World Mega Battle Tournament 1997: Second Round
| 
| align=center| 1
| align=center| 14:16
| Osaka, Japan
| 
|-
| Win
| align=center| 13-6
| Masayuki Naruse
| Submission (Achilles lock)
| Rings: Mega Battle Tournament 1997 Semifinal 1
| 
| align=center| 1
| align=center| 12:28
| Tokyo, Japan
| 
|-
| Loss
| align=center| 12-6
| Tsuyoshi Kohsaka
| Submission 
| Rings : Mega Battle Tournament 1996: Grand Final
| 
| align=center| 1
| align=center| 10:04
| Tokyo, Japan
| 
|-
| Loss
| align=center| 12-5
| Kiyoshi Tamura
| Submission 
| Rings: Battle Dimensions Tournament 1996 Opening Round
| 
| align=center| 1
| align=center| 14:40
| Nagoya, Japan
| 
|-
| Loss
| align=center| 12-4
| Adilson Lima
| Submission (armbar)
| Rings: Maelstrom 6
| 
| align=center| 1
| align=center| 24:52
| Tokyo, Japan
| 
|-
| Win
| align=center| 12-3
| Mestre Hulk
| Submission (chin to the eye)
| Shoot Boxing: S-Cup 1996
| 
| align=center| 1
| align=center| 6:59
| Japan
| 
|-
| Loss
| align=center| 11-3
| Carlos Barreto
| Submission (rear-naked choke)
| UVF 1: Universal Vale Tudo Fighting 1
| 
| align=center| 2
| align=center| 3:15
| Japan
| 
|-
| Loss
|align=center| 11-2
| Mitsuya Nagai
| KO (strikes)
| Rings: Maelstrom 1
| 
|align=center| 1
|align=center| 11:24
| Niigata, Japan
|
|-
| Win
| align=center| 11-1
| Wataru Sakata
| Submission 
| Rings: Budokan Hall 1996
| 
| align=center| 1
| align=center| 10:44
| Tokyo, Japan
| 
|-
| Loss
| align=center| 10-1
| Ricardo Morais
| Submission (rear-naked choke)
| IAFC: Absolute Fighting Championship 1
| 
| align=center| 1
| align=center| 9:44
| Moscow, Russia
| 
|-
| Win
| align=center| 10-0
| Achmed Sagidgusenov
| Submission (achilles lock)
| IAFC: Absolute Fighting Championship 1
| 
| align=center| 1
| align=center| 0:05
| Moscow, Russia
| 
|-
| Win
| align=center| 9-0
| Igor Vovchanchyn
| Submission (chin to the eye) 
| IAFC: Absolute Fighting Championship 1
| 
| align=center| 1
| align=center| 6:30
| Moscow, Russia
| 
|-
| Win
| align=center| 8-0
| Andrei Besedin
| Submission (guillotine choke)
| IAFC: Absolute Fighting Championship 1
| 
| align=center| 1
| align=center| 1:21
| Moscow, Russia
| 
|-
| Win
| align=center| 7-0
| Zagil Eribinov
| Submission (armbar)
| IAFC: Absolute Fighting Championship 1
| 
| align=center| 1
| align=center| 1:35
| Moscow, Russia
| 
|-
| Win
| align=center| 6-0
| Nikolai Zouev
| Submission 
| Rings: Battle Dimensions Tournament 1995 Opening Round
| 
| align=center| 1
| align=center| 12:27
| Fukuoka, Japan
| 
|-
| Win
| align=center| 5-0
| Victor Yerohin
| Submission (rear-naked choke)
| IAFC: Absolute Fighting Eurasian Championship
| 
| align=center| 1
| align=center| 3:54
| Moscow, Russia
| 
|-
| Win
| align=center| 4-0
| Leonid Efremov
| Submission (achilles lock)
| IAFC: Absolute Fighting Eurasian Championship
| 
| align=center| 1
| align=center| 1:09
| Moscow, Russia
| 
|-
| Win
| align=center| 3-0
| Vadim Shevchenko
| Submission (achilles lock)
| IAFC: Absolute Fighting Eurasian Championship
| 
| align=center| 1
| align=center| 0:08
| Moscow, Russia
| 
|-
| Win
| align=center| 2-0
| Maxim Tarasov
| Submission (achilles lock)
| IAFC: Absolute Fighting Eurasian Championship
| 
| align=center| 1
| align=center| 0:41
| Moscow, Russia
| 
|-
| Win
| align=center| 1-0
| Piotr Tjernov
| Submission (achilles lock)
| IAFC: Absolute Fighting Eurasian Championship
| 
| align=center| 1
| align=center| 0:36
| Moscow, Russia
|

References

External links
 Mikhail Ilyukhin's MMA Record of Fight Matrix

Living people
1966 births
Russian male mixed martial artists
Light heavyweight mixed martial artists
Russian sambo practitioners
Sportspeople from Tula, Russia
Mixed martial artists utilizing sambo